Tenfu Tea College, now called Zhangzhou College of Science and Technology, is the world's first private vocational college to specialize in the study of the tea industry. It is in Zhangzhou, Fujian, China. Degrees are offered in Tea Production and Processing, Market Prospection and Marketing, Food Processing, Tea Culture, and Tourism Management.

See also
 Tatung Institute of Commerce and Technology
 Lu-Yu Tea Culture Institute
 Ping-Lin Tea Museum
 Tenfu Tea Museum
 China National Tea Museum
 History of tea in China

References

External links
 

Educational institutions established in 2007
Tea industry
Universities and colleges in Fujian
Chinese tea ceremony schools
2007 establishments in China